The Gulf of Paria is a  shallow (180 m at its deepest) semi-enclosed inland sea located between the island of Trinidad (Republic of Trinidad and Tobago) and the east coast of Venezuela. It separates the two countries by as little as 15 km at its narrowest and 120 km at its widest points. The tides within the Gulf are semi-diurnal in nature with a range of approximately 1m. The Gulf of Paria is considered to be one of the best natural harbors on the Atlantic coast of the Americas. The jurisdiction of the Gulf of Paria is split between Trinidad and Tobago and Venezuela with Trinidad and Tobago having control over approximately  (37.7%) and Venezuela the remainder (62.3%).

It was originally named the Gulf of the Whale by Christopher Columbus, but the 19th-century whaling industry eliminated whales from the area and populations have never recovered. Cartographic sources of the late 18th century repeatedly refer to it as the Sad Gulf.

In the north, the Gulf is connected to the Caribbean Sea through the Dragons' Mouths between the Paria Peninsula of Venezuela and the Chaguaramas Peninsula of Trinidad. In the south, the Gulf is connected to the Atlantic through the Columbus Channel, also known as the Serpent's Mouth, between the Cedros Peninsula and the Orinoco Delta.

Oil and natural gas
The Gulf of Paria lies entirely within the broad strike-slip plate boundary zone of the southeastern Caribbean. The structure of the Gulf consists of a complex set of transtensional basins superimposed on a fold-and-thrust belt (Serrania del Interior of eastern Venezuela). The petroleum of Trinidad has been generated by prolific Upper Cretaceous source rocks, time equivalent to the La Luna and Querecual formations in Colombia and Venezuela. These source rocks were then overlain by a thick succession of Paleogene deep-water sediments (shales and deep water sandstones) and shallow marine siliciclastic reservoir rocks. The transpression due to the influence of the Caribbean plate created several sub-basins across the Trinidad area; each having distinctive petroleum systems. The hydrocarbon basins in Trinidad are Southern Basin, Columbus Basin, Carupano Basin, Central Range/Darrien Ridge Basin and the Caroni Basin and Gulf of Paria Pull-apart Basin.

The Caroni Basin is a Cenozoic basin bounded to the north by the El Pilar fault zone and the Northern Range fold-thrust belt and to the south by the Central Range fold-thrust belt. Its stratigraphy features a shallowing section from the Miocene which overlies Palaeocene and Lower Cretaceous deep-water sediments. The Gulf of Paria is the western offshore extension of the Caroni basin. However, its deformation is now extensional due to the right-stepping of the dextral El Pilar fault to the dextral Warm Springs fault. The Los Bajos fault separates the Gulf of Paria from the Southern basin sediments. Natural gas has been discovered in the onshore Caroni basin while in the Gulf of Paria, both oil and gas have been discovered.

In 2021 an oil spill was discovered in the gulf. Between 2018 and April 2021 there have been 498 reported oil spills on land and at sea. There have been no resulting prosecutions or fines by Trinidad and Tobago authorities.

Fisheries
The Gulf of Paria is a brackish water body - wet season salinities are below 23 ppt (parts per thousand) with extensive mangroves along the Venezuelan and Trinidadian coastlines. This body of water is basically a shallow sedimentary basin with a maximum depth of 30 m (16 fathoms) and a smooth substratum of fine mud with patches of shell debris and sand (Kenny and Bacon, 1981). These conditions lend themselves to favourable fisheries conditions and the Gulf itself is an important fishery (Heileman and Ramsaroop, 1990). The proximity of the Orinoco Delta to the Gulf suggests that these waters are strongly influenced by fluvial discharges from the Amazon and Orinoco River systems, with the intensity of these discharges varying with the seasons (van Andel and Postma, 1954; Gade, 1961). These rivers are thought to be important effectors of nutrient enhancing upwelling currents on the adjacent continental shelf and sources of primary and secondary productivity for the water around Trinidad, especially in the Gulf (Farbes, 1983). As such, Trinidad supports a more productive and diverse exploitable fish and invertebrate resource base than most of the Eastern Caribbean islands (Agard et al. 1996). The Gulf of Paria is the most important fishing ground for shrimp and finfish in Trinidad.

In recent years, Venezuelan pirates have threatened fishermen operating in the region.

Port and logistics
Major ports located within the Gulf of Paria basin include:
 The Port of Port of Spain
 Plipdeco's Port of Point Lisas in Couva
 Port of San Fernando
 Port of Point Fortin
 Pedernales in Venezuela's Delta Amacuro state
Oldendorff Carriers floating facility - Oldendorff Carriers have been operating a floating facility consisting of two cranes, within Trinidadian waters since 2012, for the purpose of transshipment of iron ore from Santana, Brazil to the Middle and the Far East.

See also
Piracy off the coast of Venezuela

References

Further reading

External links

 
Paria
Paria
Paria
Trinidad and Tobago–Venezuela border
Trinidad (island)